Joseph C. Hibson (August 3, 1843 - April 14, 1911) was a Union Army soldier in the American Civil War who received the U.S. military's highest decoration, the Medal of Honor.

Hibson was born in London, England on August 3, 1843, and joined the Army from New York City in August 1861. He was awarded the Medal of Honor, for extraordinary heroism on 13,14 and 18 July 1863, while serving as a Private with Company C, 48th New York Infantry, near Fort Wagner, South Carolina. His Medal of Honor was issued on October 23, 1897. He was transferred to the Veteran Reserve Corps in December 1863.

In 1908, the United States Congress passed a private bill increasing Hibson's pension to $55 per month in lieu of what he had been receiving previously.
Hibson died at the age of 67, on April 14, 1911, and was buried at Cypress Hills Cemetery in New York City.

Medal of Honor citation

References

External links

1843 births
1911 deaths
Union Army soldiers
United States Army Medal of Honor recipients
American Civil War recipients of the Medal of Honor
Military personnel from London
English-born Medal of Honor recipients
English emigrants to the United States
People of New York (state) in the American Civil War